Lukáš Szabó (born 4 October 1992) is a Slovak football striker who plays for Slovak club Šamorín.

Club career
He came to Liberec in summer 2013, from Slovak second level club FK Slovan Duslo Šaľa. Szabo made his professional debut for Slovan Liberec on 21 July 2013 against SK Sigma Olomouc, entering in as a substitute in place of Michael Rabušic.

International career
He is a former member of Slovakia under-21 team.

External links
FC Slovan Liberec profile
FC Nitra profile
Corgoň Liga profile

Eurofotbal profile

References

1992 births
Living people
Slovak footballers
Slovakia under-21 international footballers
Association football forwards
FK Slovan Duslo Šaľa players
FC Slovan Liberec players
FC ViOn Zlaté Moravce players
Győri ETO FC players
Kazincbarcikai SC footballers
Gyirmót FC Győr players
Lipót SE players
Dorogi FC footballers
FC ŠTK 1914 Šamorín players
Czech First League players
Slovak Super Liga players
2. Liga (Slovakia) players
Nemzeti Bajnokság II players
Slovak expatriate footballers
Expatriate footballers in the Czech Republic
Slovak expatriate sportspeople in the Czech Republic
Expatriate footballers in Hungary
Slovak expatriate sportspeople in Hungary